Yekaterina Yuryevna Skudina (born 21 March 1981) is a Russian world champion and Olympic sailor.

Personal

Skudina has a PhD from the STANKIN university in "Social and managerial technologies as a resource for achieving leadership in sports in the international arena", and enjoys playing the piano. As of 2014, she lives in Moscow, and is a member of Pirogovo Yacht Club.

After completing her Olympic career in 2012, she founded the PROyachting yacht project, which promotes sailing among a business audience. Since 2012, she has been a member of the Presidium of the All-Russian Sailing Federation, where she oversaw the development of Olympic yachting in Russia.

Sailing

World championships
Skudina was awarded the Roy Yamaguchi Memorial Trophy for winning the world championships in the women's Snipe class in 1998, and the bronze medal at the Yngling open world championships in 2007. At the 2011 World Championships, Skudina finished fourth in the Elliott 6m class.

Olympic Games
Skudina took part in three Olympic Games:
2004 Summer Olympics, 8th place (Yngling)
2008 Summer Olympics, 6th place (Yngling) 
2012 Summer Olympics, 4th place (Elliott 6m)

Other main regattas
Skudina won the European Sailing Championships in 2007 (Yngling) and 2010 (Elliott 6m). She was 2nd at the European Sailing Championships in 2011 (Elliott 6m). She won the Kiel Week in the Elliott 6m class in 2011 and the Stena Match Cup Sweden in 2010.

References

External links
Official website

1981 births
Living people
Olympic sailors of Russia
Russian female sailors (sport)
Sailors at the 2004 Summer Olympics – Yngling
Sailors at the 2008 Summer Olympics – Yngling
Sailors at the 2012 Summer Olympics – Elliott 6m
Snipe class female world champions
World champions in sailing for Russia
People from Dolgoprudny
Sportspeople from Moscow Oblast